The Roman Catholic Diocese of Nacala is a diocese located in the city of Nacala in the Ecclesiastical province of Nampula in Mozambique.

History
 October 11, 1991: Established as Diocese of Nacala from the Metropolitan Archdiocese of Nampula

Leadership
 Bishops of Nacala (Roman rite)
 Bishop Germano Grachane, C.M. (October 11, 1991 - April 25, 2018)
 Bishop Alberto Vera Aréjula, O. de M. (since April 25, 2018)

Persecution and insecurity 
In September 2022 the Diocese of Nacala began to be affected by the Islamist insurgency that had begun in 2017 in Cabo Delgado, proving that the terrorists, affiliated with Ansar al-Sunna, were spreading South. An attack on a Catholic Mission in Chipene left the entire premises destroyed, and the insurgents murdered a Catholic nun, Sister Maria de Coppi. Later, the same insurgents killed at least three Christians in surrounding settlements, slitting their throats, according to Bishop Alberto Vera Aréjula. This marked a difference in strategy by the terrorists, who until now had mostly refrained from specifically targeting Christians and Christian symbols and buildings.

See also
Roman Catholicism in Mozambique

References

Sources
 GCatholic.org
 Catholic Hierarchy

Roman Catholic dioceses in Mozambique
Roman Catholic dioceses established in 1991
1991 establishments in Mozambique
Roman Catholic Ecclesiastical Province of Nampula